The 2013–14 UCLA Bruins men's basketball team represented the University of California, Los Angeles during the 2013–14 NCAA Division I men's basketball season.  The Bruins were led by first year head coach Steve Alford and played home games at Pauley Pavilion as members in the Pac-12 Conference. They finished the season 28–9, and advanced to the Sweet 16 of the NCAA tournament.

UCLA finished 12–6 in Pac-12 play, finishing in second place in the conference. At the Pac-12 tournament, the Bruins defeated the Arizona Wildcats 75–71 for the tournament championship. Kyle Anderson was voted the tournament's Most Outstanding Player after scoring 21 points and grabbing 15 rebounds in the championship game. As Pac-12 Tournament champions, the Bruins received an automatic bid to the NCAA Tournament, where they defeated Tulsa and Stephen F. Austin to advance to the Sweet Sixteen—their first regional semifinal appearance since 2008—where they lost to Florida, who improved to 4–0 all-time against UCLA in the NCAA tournament.

Previous season

Departures

Recruiting class

Roster

Schedule

|-
!colspan=9 style=|Exhibition

|-
!colspan=9 style=|Non Conference Season

|-
!colspan=9 style=| Conference Season

|-
!colspan=9 style=| Pac-12 Tournament

|-

|-

|-
!colspan=12 style="background:#0073CF;"| NCAA tournament

Honors
January 27, 2014 – Kyle Anderson is named Pac-12 Conference Player-of-the-Week
 March 10, 2014 – Jordan Adams and Kyle Anderson are named to the All-Pac-12 Conference First Team; Bryce Alford and Zach LaVine are named to the Pac-12 All-Freshman Team; Jordan Adams and Norman Powell are named honorable mention of the All-Defensive Team
 March 11, 2014 – Jordan Adams and Kyle Anderson are named to the USBWA District IX All-District Team
 March 12, 2014 – Kyle Anderson and Jordan Adams are named to the NABC District 20 All-District First Team
 March 15, 2014 – Kyle Anderson was named Pac-12 Conference tournament MVP
 March 31, 2014 – Kyle Anderson was named to the third-team Associated Press and Sporting News All-America teams

Rankings

Team players drafted in the NBA

Notes

 September 26, 2013 – Isaac Hamilton joins the team 
 October 17, 2013 – The Bruins were picked to finish 2nd in the conference by the Pac-12 media
 October 31, 2013 – Isaac Hamilton's appeal to NCAA to allow him to play this season without having to sit out a season was denied.
 November 29, 2013 – The team won the Continental Tire Las Vegas Invitational; Kyle Anderson was the tournament's MVP; Jordan Adams and Zach LaVine were named to the all-tournament team.
 January 27, 2014 – Sophomore Anderson was named Pac-12 Player of the Week
 February 27, 2014 - Anderson and Adams missed one game after being suspended for a violation of team rules.
 March 14, 2014 – Director of Operations Tyus Edney to be inducted into the Pac-12 Conference Hall of Honor.
 Home attendance for the season averaged 8,136 for the 13,800-seat Pauley Pavilion.  It was down from 9,549 in 2012–13, with school officials attributing the higher attendance to the renovated reopening of the arena.
 March 15, 2014 – Norman Powell shot 16 of 18 points at the free throw line at the Pac-12 tournament, tied for the fourth best percentage in tournament history

See also
2013–14 UCLA Bruins women's basketball team

References

External links

 2013–14 Season notes and stats

UCLA
UCLA Bruins men's basketball seasons
UCLA
NCAA
NCAA
Pac-12 Conference men's basketball tournament championship seasons